The 2007 FIFA Women's World Cup Final was an association football match which determined the winner of the 2007 FIFA Women's World Cup, contested by the women's national teams of the member associations of FIFA. It was played on 30 September 2007 at the Hongkou Football Stadium, in Shanghai, China and won by Germany, who defeated Brazil 2–0.

Finalists 
The match was between Germany, who had won the previous Women's World Cup final and Brazil, who had never won a major world title, or indeed even reached the finals of a Women's World Cup. This was the first time in the history of the Women's World Cup that a European and South American had met each other in the final. Germany had not conceded a single goal in the whole competition whereas Brazil were free-scoring. Led by striker Marta, who had scored 7 goals, Brazil had scored seventeen goals in their route to the final, including four against title-rivals United States in the semi-finals. It was considered as "the rematch of the 2002 FIFA World Cup Final", except it was the men's teams.

Route to the final 
Germany began their campaign to retain the trophy with the most lopsided World Cup win in history, beating Argentina 11–0.

Match

Details

References

External links 
 Official FIFA Women's World Cup 2007 site

Final
2007
Fifa World Cup Final 2007
2007
World Cup Final 2007
 
 
September 2007 sports events in Asia
2000s in Shanghai